The 2022–23 Barangay Ginebra San Miguel season is the 43rd season of the franchise in the Philippine Basketball Association (PBA).

Key dates
May 15: The PBA Season 47 draft was held at the Robinsons Place Manila in Manila.
January 12: Long-time import Justin Brownlee became a naturalized Filipino citizen.
March 1: Team captain LA Tenorio's consecutive games played of 744 games ended due to a groin injury.

Draft picks

Roster

Philippine Cup

Eliminations

Standings

Game log

|-bgcolor=ccffcc
| 1
| June 12
| Blackwater
| W 85–82
| Christian Standhardinger (21)
| Scottie Thompson (16)
| Scottie Thompson (9)
| Ynares Center
| 1–0
|-bgcolor=ccffcc
| 2
| June 15
| Rain or Shine
| W 90–85
| Japeth Aguilar (23)
| Christian Standhardinger (14)
| Scottie Thompson (8)
| SM Mall of Asia Arena
| 2–0
|-bgcolor=ffcccc
| 3
| June 19
| Magnolia
| L 84–89
| LA Tenorio (15)
| Aguilar, Standhardinger (10)
| Scottie Thompson (5)
| SM Mall of Asia Arena
| 2–1
|-bgcolor=ccffcc
| 4
| June 22
| NLEX
| W 83–75
| Japeth Aguilar (20)
| Pinto, Standhardinger (9)
| LA Tenorio (8)
| SM Mall of Asia Arena
| 3–1
|-bgcolor=ccffcc
| 5
| June 24
| San Miguel
| W 75–72
| Christian Standhardinger (20)
| Japeth Aguilar (14)
| Scottie Thompson (7)
| SM Mall of Asia Arena
| 4–1

|-bgcolor=ccffcc
| 6
| July 1
| Converge
| W 105–89
| Scottie Thompson (24)
| Christian Standhardinger (13)
| LA Tenorio (10)
| Smart Araneta Coliseum
| 5–1
|-bgcolor=ccffcc
| 7
| July 6
| Terrafirma
| W 106–82
| Japeth Aguilar (22)
| Scottie Thompson (12)
| Christian Standhardinger (7)
| Smart Araneta Coliseum
| 6–1
|-bgcolor=ffcccc
| 8
| July 10
| TNT
| L 92–106
| Japeth Aguilar (18)
| Christian Standhardinger (12)
| Tenorio, Thompson (7)
| Smart Araneta Coliseum10,308
| 6–2
|-bgcolor=ffcccc
| 9
| July 13
| Meralco
| L 73–90
| Scottie Thompson (14)
| Japeth Aguilar (13)
| LA Tenorio (5)
| Smart Araneta Coliseum
| 6–3
|-bgcolor=ccffcc
| 10
| July 17
| NorthPort
| W 100–93
| Scottie Thompson (23)
| Scottie Thompson (15)
| Scottie Thompson (8)
| Smart Araneta Coliseum
| 7–3
|-bgcolor=ccffcc
| 11
| July 21
| Phoenix
| W 100–93
| Japeth Aguilar (17)
| Scottie Thompson (14)
| Pinto, Pringle (6)
| Smart Araneta Coliseum
| 8–3

Playoffs

Bracket

Game log

|-bgcolor=ffcccc
| 1
| July 24
| Meralco
| L 82–93
| Scottie Thompson (29)
| Scottie Thompson (10)
| LA Tenorio (4)
| Smart Araneta Coliseum
| 0–1
|-bgcolor=ccffcc
| 2
| July 29
| Meralco
| W 94–87
| Japeth Aguilar (25)
| Christian Standhardinger (12)
| Scottie Thompson (9)
| Filoil EcoOil Centre
| 1–1
|-bgcolor=ffcccc
| 3
| July 31
| Meralco
| L 104–106
| Scottie Thompson (26)
| Christian Standhardinger (10)
| Pringle, Tenorio (6)
| SM Mall of Asia Arena
| 1–2

Commissioner's Cup

Eliminations

Standings

Game log

|-bgcolor=ffcccc
| 1
| September 28, 2022
| Rain or Shine
| L 71–93
| Justin Brownlee (20)
| Justin Brownlee (16)
| Justin Brownlee (5)
| SM Mall of Asia Arena
| 0–1

|-bgcolor=ccffcc
| 2
| October 2, 2022
| Meralco
| W 99–91
| Justin Brownlee (34)
| Scottie Thompson (9)
| Scottie Thompson (9)
| Smart Araneta Coliseum
| 1–1
|-bgcolor=ccffcc
| 3
| October 9, 2022
| Bay Area
| W 111–93
| Justin Brownlee (46)
| Justin Brownlee (12)
| Scottie Thompson (5)
| PhilSports Arena
| 2–1
|-bgcolor=ffcccc
| 4
| October 14, 2022
| Phoenix
| L 93–101
| Stanley Pringle (25)
| Justin Brownlee (11)
| Justin Brownlee (8)
| Smart Araneta Coliseum
| 2–2
|-bgcolor=ccffcc
| 5
| October 23, 2022
| Magnolia
| W 103–97
| Justin Brownlee (26)
| Jamie Malonzo (14)
| Justin Brownlee (12)
| SM Mall of Asia Arena12,087
| 3–2
|-bgcolor=ccffcc
| 6
| October 28, 2022
| Terrafirma
| W 111–90
| Justin Brownlee (23)
| Justin Brownlee (11)
| Justin Brownlee (11)
| Smart Araneta Coliseum
| 4–2

|-bgcolor=ccffcc
| 7
| November 6, 2022
| San Miguel
| W 97–96
| Justin Brownlee (33)
| Aguilar, Brownlee (11)
| Justin Brownlee (9)
| Smart Araneta Coliseum10,149
| 5–2
|-bgcolor=ccffcc
| 8
| November 18, 2022
| Blackwater
| W 98–84
| Justin Brownlee (17)
| Christian Standhardinger (9)
| Scottie Thompson (6)
| Smart Araneta Coliseum
| 6–2
|-bgcolor=ccffcc
| 9
| November 20, 2022
| TNT
| W 89–85
| Justin Brownlee (21)
| Japeth Aguilar (12)
| Justin Brownlee (8)
| Smart Araneta Coliseum
| 7–2
|-bgcolor=ffcccc
| 10
| November 25, 2022
| NLEX
| L 117–120 (OT)
| Justin Brownlee (39)
| Scottie Thompson (12)
| LA Tenorio (8)
| PhilSports Arena
| 7–3
|-bgcolor=ccffcc
| 11
| November 27, 2022
| NorthPort
| W 122–105
| Justin Brownlee (31)
| Brownlee, Standhardinger (13)
| Brownlee, Thompson (9)
| PhilSports Arena
| 8–3
|-bgcolor=ccffcc
| 12
| November 30, 2022
| Converge
| W 115–96
| Justin Brownlee (25)
| Justin Brownlee (12)
| Justin Brownlee (9)
| PhilSports Arena
| 9–3

Playoffs

Bracket

Game log

|-bgcolor=ccffcc
| 1
| December 7, 2022
| NorthPort
| W 118–102
| Justin Brownlee (39)
| Jamie Malonzo (9)
| Justin Brownlee (7)
| PhilSports Arena
| 1–0
|-bgcolor=ccffcc
| 2
| December 10, 2022
| NorthPort
| W 99–93
| Justin Brownlee (20)
| Brownlee, Thompson (9)
| Scottie Thompson (9)
| PhilSports Arena
| 2–0

|-bgcolor=ccffcc
| 1
| December 14, 2022
| Magnolia
| W 87–84
| Jamie Malonzo (21)
| Justin Brownlee (13)
| Brownlee, Tenorio, Thompson (6)
| PhilSports Arena
| 1–0
|-bgcolor=ffcccc
| 2
| December 16, 2022
| Magnolia
| L 95–96
| Justin Brownlee (34)
| Scottie Thompson (9)
| LA Tenorio (7)
| PhilSports Arena
| 1–1
|-bgcolor=ccffcc
| 3
| December 18, 2022
| Magnolia
| W 103–80
| Justin Brownlee (38)
| Justin Brownlee (9)
| Justin Brownlee (7)
| PhilSports Arena
| 2–1
|-bgcolor=ccffcc
| 4
| December 21, 2022
| Magnolia
| W 99–84
| Justin Brownlee (24)
| Justin Brownlee (14)
| Brownlee, Malonzo (6)
| SM Mall of Asia Arena
| 3–1

|-bgcolor=ccffcc
| 1
| December 25, 2022
| Bay Area
| W 96–81
| Justin Brownlee (28)
| Justin Brownlee (13)
| Brownlee, Thompson (6)
| SM Mall of Asia Arena18,252
| 1–0
|-bgcolor=ffcccc
| 2
| December 28, 2022
| Bay Area
| L 82–99
| Justin Brownlee (32)
| Justin Brownlee (11)
| Pinto, Tenorio (4)
| Smart Araneta Coliseum16,044
| 1–1
|-bgcolor=ccffcc
| 3
| January 4, 2023
| Bay Area
| W 89–82
| Justin Brownlee (34)
| Justin Brownlee (17)
| Brownlee, Thompson (4) 
| SM Mall of Asia Arena15,004
| 2–1
|-bgcolor=ffcccc
| 4
| January 6, 2023
| Bay Area
| L 86–94
| Justin Brownlee (23)
| Justin Brownlee (13)
| Justin Brownlee (11)
| SM Mall of Asia Arena17,236
| 2–2
|-bgcolor=ccffcc
| 5
| January 8, 2023
| Bay Area
| W 101–91
| Justin Brownlee (37)
| Brownlee, Malonzo (8)
| Scottie Thompson (8)
| SM Mall of Asia Arena21,823
| 3–2
|-bgcolor=ffcccc
| 6
| January 11, 2023
| Bay Area
| L 84–87
| Justin Brownlee (37)
| Justin Brownlee (10)
| Justin Brownlee (11)
| Smart Araneta Coliseum22,361
| 3–3
|-bgcolor=ccffcc
| 7
| January 15, 2023
| Bay Area
| W 114–99
| Justin Brownlee (34)
| Jamie Malonzo (17)
| Justin Brownlee (12)
| Philippine Arena54,589
| 4–3

Governors' Cup

Eliminations

Standings

Game log

|-bgcolor=ccffcc
| 1
| February 5
| Rain or Shine
| W 116–108
| Justin Brownlee (29)
| Justin Brownlee (10)
| Justin Brownlee (11)
| Smart Araneta Coliseum10,080
| 1–0
|-bgcolor=ccffcc
| 2
| February 8
| NLEX
| W 114–111 
| Justin Brownlee (44)
| Justin Brownlee (16)
| Scottie Thompson (10)
| Smart Araneta Coliseum
| 2–0
|-bgcolor=ccffcc
| 3
| February 10
| NorthPort
| W 115–100
| Jamie Malonzo (28)
| Justin Brownlee (15)
| Justin Brownlee (12)
| SM Mall of Asia Arena
| 3–0
|-bgcolor=ffcccc
| 4
| February 12
| Magnolia
| L 88–118
| Justin Brownlee (22)
| Christian Standhardinger (11)
| Justin Brownlee (9)
| SM Mall of Asia Arena11,212
| 3–1
|-bgcolor=ffcccc
| 5
| February 17
| San Miguel
| L 99–102
| Christian Standhardinger (29)
| Scottie Thompson (11)
| Justin Brownlee (9)
| Smart Araneta Coliseum
| 3–2
|-bgcolor=ccffcc
| 6
| February 19
| Blackwater
| W 115–93
| Christian Standhardinger (27)
| Justin Brownlee (10)
| Scottie Thompson (7)
| PhilSports Arena
| 4–2

|-bgcolor=ccffcc
| 7
| March 1
| Meralco
| W 112–107
| Christian Standhardinger (31)
| Christian Standhardinger (10)
| Scottie Thompson (10)
| Smart Araneta Coliseum
| 5–2
|-bgcolor=ccffcc
| 8
| March 3
| Phoenix
| W 109–89
| Christian Standhardinger (28)
| Christian Standhardinger (12)
| Christian Standhardinger (8)
| Smart Araneta Coliseum
| 6–2
|-bgcolor=ccffcc
| 9
| March 5
| Converge
| W 120–101
| Jamie Malonzo (29)
| Christian Standhardinger (12)
| John Pinto (8)
| PhilSports Arena
| 7–2
|-bgcolor=ccffcc
| 10
| March 8
| Terrafirma
| W 109–104
| Justin Brownlee (38)
| Jamie Malonzo (13)
| Brownlee, Pinto, Standhardinger (6)
| Ynares Center
| 8–2
|- align="center"
|colspan="9" bgcolor="#bbcaff"|All-Star Break
|-bgcolor=ffcccc
| 11
| March 17
| TNT
| L 105–114
| Justin Brownlee (27)
| Christian Standhardinger (13)
| Scottie Thompson (10)
| PhilSports Arena
| 8–3

Playoffs

Bracket

Game log

|-bgcolor=ccffcc
| 1
| March 19
| NLEX
| W 127–93
| Justin Brownlee (31)
| Justin Brownlee (13)
| Pinto, Thompson (7)
| Smart Araneta Coliseum
| 1–0

Transactions

Free agency

Signings

Trades

Pre-season

Mid-season

Recruited imports

References

Barangay Ginebra San Miguel seasons
Barangay Ginebra San Miguel